Aakasmika is a 1993 Indian Kannada language action thriller film directed by T. S. Nagabharana. The film stars Rajkumar, Geetha and Madhavi. The film was based on Ta Ra Su's trilogy Aakasmika – Aparadhi – Parinama  thereby becoming the second Kannada movie to be based on three novels, the first being 1973 movie Naagarahaavu which incidentally was based on three novels of the same writer.

The movie was produced by S. A. Govindaraju and has music and lyrics written by Hamsalekha. The film opened to packed houses across Karnataka for many months and won many awards and critical acclaim. The film was highly successful at the box office. The movie saw a theatrical run of 25 weeks. At the age of 64, Rajkumar won his 8th Filmfare Award in Best Actor Category. The song Huttidare is still considered one among the top Kannada songs.

Nagabharana had revealed that Shiva Rajkumar was supposed to be the hero of this movie, but after listening to the script, it was decided that it should be made with Rajkumar.

Plot 
ACP Narasimha Murthy places a wreath at the grave of his wife Clara. It is shown in a flashback that after attending a wedding, Murthy boards a train headed to Bangalore; Indira and Vyasaraya are his co-passengers. Vyasaraya and Murthy connect over their interests in theatre. At a terminal, the former alights his cigar for refreshment, while Inspector Rajagopal boards; he states that he is on a lookout for a pimp and details the pimp's description to Murthy, who turns out to be Vyasaraya. 

Later, Vyasaraya reappears brandishing a knife fending off Murthy, who is now protective of Indira. However, Murthy and Indira get off the train out to panic and find themselves at night to stay in a house. Indira reveals to Murthy that Vyasaraya had paid her poor mother  with a promise that he would ensure that the former joins a Gubbi Drama Company. The following morning, Vyasaraya takes Indira away after fighting off Murthy with the help of his henchmen. A devastated Murthy reaches out to Rajagopal to find Indira but with no luck.

Murthy tries to regain his life after the disturbing incident until he sees a drunk woman, Clara, driving her car on a railway track. He saves her from a certain injury and drives to her lodging. There, he meets her brother Anthony who reasons that Clara's broken engagement to Reggie, due to his infidelity behind her taking to heavy drinking. As days progress, Clara and Murthy get closer, develop a liking towards each other and get married. While at their honeymoon, Clara falls off a ravine; the railing she has leaned on gives way and she falls down the rock-face to her death. 

A hapless Murthy's attempt to rescue her only leaves him injured. In the present, he is shown laying wreath on her grave, and returns to his car to find that his friends have turned up hoping to cheer him, but Murthy tells them that he is doing fine. Life's vicissitudes have only made him stronger. Murthy makes his way to a Central Jail looking for a woman named Anandi, who has been in prison for three years. He is told that she is on her death bed. He visits and finds out that she was a pimp. she dies without being of any help to him. He later receives a letter written by Anandi, that mentions names of her three associates: Vyasaraya, Thipparaju and Kaatayya. 

Murthy sets his subordinates on their trail. A man by the name of Kaatesh, who seems to have recently amassed a significant amount of wealth is summoned under the false pretext of having recovered some stolen property that belong to him. When Kaatesh denies having ever been burgled, Murthy convinces him to make a statement in writing. Having obtained his handwriting sample, Murthy has it cross-verified with that belonging to the letters found among Anandi's belongings, and the comparison reveals that Kaatesh is indeed Kaatayya. 

Under police custody, Kaatesh reveals that Tipparaju is dead, but Vyasaraya lives in Hubli. Murthy heads to Hubli and locates the house where Vyasaraya is running his prostitution racket. He locates Vaikuntaiah, Vyasaraya's aide, and thrashes him into submission to reveal that Vysaraya has left for Bangalore by train that evening. Murthy pursues the train and boards it during its following stop. While looking for Vyasaraya, he notices a girl being chased by a couple of goons at the railway platform. He gives them a chase, and as he catches up with the girl, realizes it is Indira. 

Indira tries to attack him, assuming he is one of Vysaraya's henchman. Upon realizing it is Murthy, she breaks down and reveals the incidents that transpired after Vysaraya took her from the house. she killed a man, who tried to molest her and has been constantly on the run since. Vyasaraya's henchmen appear and engage Murthy in a fist fight; Vyasaraya is killed after his leg gets trapped in the railway track and an oncoming train runs over him. Murthy and a relieved Indira walk into the darkness.

Cast

Soundtrack

The music of the film and soundtracks were scored by Hamsalekha. The song "Huttidare Kannada", composed in Sindhubhairavi Carnatic raaga, went on to become a blockbuster hit and unofficial state anthem. It was remixed in Cheluveye Ninna Nodalu (2010) starring his son Shivrajkumar. The song "Aagumbeya Prema Sanjeya" became popular for its foot-tapping melody. The album has five soundtracks. Rajkumar insisted on using the song Anuraagava Bhoga which his father used to sing in the stage play Echchamma Naayaka.

Awards
Karnataka State Film Awards
 Second Best Film — S. A. Govindaraju
 Karnataka State Film Award for Best Male Playback Singer — Rajkumar

Filmfare Awards South
 Best Film – Kannada — S. A. Govindaraju
 Best Actor – Kannada — Rajkumar 
 Best Music Director – Kannada — Hamsalekha

References

External links

1993 films
1990s Kannada-language films
Films scored by Hamsalekha
Films based on short fiction
Fictional portrayals of the Karnataka Police
Indian action thriller films
Films set in Bangalore
Films shot in Bangalore
1993 action thriller films
Films directed by T. S. Nagabharana